Meryta latifolia, commonly known as broad-leaved meryta or shade tree, is an evergreen tree endemic to Norfolk Island, Australia, where it occurs in subtropical moist forest conditions.

Description
It may have a few branches near the top. Its wood is brittle. They are oblanceolate in shape, having a narrowed base and broad, rounded apex. The fruit is round, 5 to 6 mm long, bluntly 5 or 6-ribbed.

Convicts apparently used the large leaves to wrap up dough to bake in ashes.

Taxonomy
Stephan Endlicher described the species as Botryodendrum latifolium in 1792.

German botanist Berthold Carl Seemann gave the species its current name in 1862.

Distribution and status
Meryta latifolia occurs only on Norfolk Island, and is considered critically endangered because it is dioecious, having separate male and female plants. The total number of mature individual plants is less than 150, the effective reproductive population limited by the number of surviving female plants, which number approximately 20. It occurs on ten sites on Norfolk Island, but most of these contain only one or two plants and only one site has more than 13. Although one site contains approximately 115 trees, regeneration is not occurring at this site. Continuing declines in the number of mature individuals, and number of locations and subpopulations are projected for several reasons including: lack of formal protection or management programs, the vulnerability of small populations to stochastic disturbance events (e.g. cyclones), ongoing competition with invasive weeds, predation by rats, senescence of over-mature plants, and sex ratio bias. The species is adapted to moist forest conditions and is therefore susceptible to unfavourable climate change (projected increases in the incidence of drought and extreme rainfall events that cause physical damage).

Ecology
The introduced song thrush nests in its foliage.

Cultivation
Rare in cultivation, M. latifolia may be grown fairly easily in warm frost-free climates like those of Sydney, Australia, or Florida in the United States. A slightly hardier alternative is the New Zealand Puka tree, M. sinclairii, with huge broad leaves, which can withstand frosts down to -2C once established.

References

Apiales of Australia
latifolia
Flora of Norfolk Island
Trees of Australia
Plants described in 1792